Ib Vagn Hansen (4 January 1926 – 2000) was a Danish cyclist. He competed in the 1,000 metres time trial event at the 1952 Summer Olympics.

References

External links
 

1926 births
2000 deaths
Danish male cyclists
Olympic cyclists of Denmark
Cyclists at the 1952 Summer Olympics
Cyclists from Copenhagen